Jen Green (born 1955) is a British author of non-fiction books for children and adults. She has written over 300 titles.

Life
Jen Green was born a twin and grew up in South London and Sussex. She gained her doctorate in English literature from Sussex University. After working in publishing from 1981 to 1996, she became a full-time writer. In 2012-13 she was a Royal Literary Fund Fellow at the University of Sussex. She lives by the Sussex Downs.

References

External links

 Dr Jen Green at NibWeb

1955 births
Living people
Children's non-fiction writers
British children's writers